Maicon Talhetti (born 23 February 1990) is a Brazilian footballer who most recently played for Moto Club as a midfielder.

Career
Talhetti began playing football with Figueirense FC, winning the Copa São Paulo de Futebol Júnior with the club's youth side. At age 18, Talhetti suffered a serious knee injury playing with the senior side in the Campeonato Catarinense, which required three surgeries and kept him from playing again until 2011. Shortly after he left Figueirense, spending the rest of his career playing with clubs in the Catarinense and Paraense state championships.

References

External links
Maicon Talhetti at playmakerstats.com (English version of ogol.com.br and zerozero.pt)

1990 births
Living people
Sportspeople from Santa Catarina (state)
Brazilian footballers
Association football midfielders
Campeonato Brasileiro Série B players
Figueirense FC players
Brusque Futebol Clube players
Esporte Clube Novo Hamburgo players
ABC Futebol Clube players
Clube Atlético Tubarão players
Moto Club de São Luís players
Brazilian people of Italian descent